West Hills is a neighborhood in the Southwest District of Baltimore, located between the neighborhoods of Westgate (south), Franklintown (north) and Hunting Ridge (east). Its boundaries are drawn by the Baltimore County line (west), Baltimore National Pike (south) and North Franklintown Road (north). Its eastern boundary follows Cooks Lane from Baltimore National Pike, then Briarclift Road and finally Wynans Way to the intersection with N. Franklintown Road.

Demographics
Its population, as of the 2010 census, was more than 75 percent black. The median household income of $35,557 in West Hills for 2010 was a close match to the citywide median of $39,113. However, the neighborhood's residents fared somewhat better, with 13.8 percent living on incomes below the poverty level, compared with 22.7 percent citywide.

Public transportation
Route 20 (MTA Maryland) running along Cooks Lane at the eastern edge of West Hills, provides residents with transit bus service to Downtown Baltimore, Edmondson Village, Westview Mall and Security Square Mall.

Route 23 (MTA Maryland) stops at West Side Skill Center, at the southeast corner of West Mills. It operates between Catonsville and Downtown Baltimore on the west side of the city, and continues to Eastpoint Mall on the east side of the city.

See also
 List of Baltimore neighborhoods

References

Neighborhoods in Baltimore
Southwest Baltimore